Patosia is a genus of plant in family Juncaceae described as a genus in 1890.

The genus contains only one known species, Patosia clandestina,  native to  southern South America (Chile, Argentina, Bolivia).

References

Juncaceae
Flora of South America
Monotypic Poales genera